Nandan is a county of Hechi City, in the northwest of Guangxi, China.

Administrative divisions
There are 7 towns, 3 townships and 1 ethnic township in the county.

Towns:
Chengguan (城关镇), Dachang (大厂镇), Chehe (车河镇), Mangchang (芒场镇), Liuzhai (Liuchai) (六寨镇), Yueli (月里镇), Wu'ai (吾隘镇)

Townships:
Luofu Township (罗富乡), Zhongbao Miao Ethnic Township (中堡苗族乡), Bawei Yao Ethnic Township (八圩瑶族乡), Lihu Yao Ethnic Township (里湖瑶族乡)

Demographics

72.73% of the people belong to the national minority. Ethnic groups include Zhuang, Han, Yao, Mulao, Maonan, Miao, and Shui. In these ethnic groups, Zhuang population was 101,165 (34.71%), Han was 75,903 (27.27%).

Climate

Transportation
Qiangui Railway
China National Highway 210

References

External links
Official website of Nandan Government

Counties of Guangxi
Administrative divisions of Hechi